John Ratcliffe (c. 1536 – 1590) of Ordsall, Lancashire, England, was an English politician.

He was a Member (MP) of the Parliament of England for Wigan in 1563 and for Lancashire in 1571 and 1572.

References

1536 births
1590 deaths
Members of the Parliament of England (pre-1707) for Lancashire
English MPs 1563–1567
English MPs 1571
English MPs 1572–1583